Count Károly Vécsey de Hernádvécse et Hajnácskő (November 24, 1803 – October 6, 1849) was a honvéd general in the Hungarian Army.  He was executed for his part in the Hungarian Revolution of 1848, and is considered one of the 13 Martyrs of Arad.

Ancestry

The Vécsey family originated from Ugocsa and Abaúj counties, tracing its ancestry there back to the 15th century. The family took the name of the village of its first known ancestors at Hernádvécse, Abaúj. Balázs Szőllősi de Vécse born in 1470. The family's wealth grew immensely when Sándor Vécsey married Mária Csápy de Polyánka around 1517, whose family had Hungarian royal ties. On November 21, 1692 Lipót László Vécsey married and forged two branches of the family; the Gömör and Várad branches, which lasted through the 19th century. The family thrived in this time and created a long tradition of military service.

Along the Gömör line, Siegbert Vécsey, Károly's grandfather, was born in 1789, and was eventually appointed to the Military Order of Maria Theresa and became a lieutenant-general in the Imperial army. His son, Count Ágoston Vécsey was a cavalry commander and also admitted into the Order of Maria Theresa, and was the last commander of the Viennese Hungarian Noble Guard before it was disbanded. His wife, Károly Vécsey's mother, Amalia Colson died in 1826. From this marriage the following children were born:

Mária (1805–1875) 
Károly
Angelika (1808–1885)
Ede (1810–1856), Imperial and royal chamberlain. In 1848 he was commander of the 2nd Imperial infantry. In July, he fought against Serbian rebels.  He retired a lieutenant colonel and died in Dresden. He was married to the Countess Mary Blankenstein.
Jenő (1811–1866) Imperial and royal chamberlain, Captain in the Imperial Hussars.
Sándor (1812–1855) Jak Hódmezõvásárhely parish priest and abbot
Ágoston (1813–1879) imperial and royal chamberlain
Karolina (1817–1898)
Emília (1818–1819)
Amália (1820–1892)
Jozefina (1821–1861)
Adolf (1824–?)
Felícia (1826–1883)

Karoly Vécsey married his wife Carolina Duffaud on August 15, 1849. She gave birth to a stillborn child soon after.

Vécsey's confession at Arad began as follows: "My name is Count Károly Vécsey, I was born in Pest, Hungary, I am forty-two years old, Catholic, married, no children." However, birth records at Budapest make no mention of him during this time. This confession also contradicted his enrolment form at the Military Engineering Academy of Vienna which stated: "Vécsey, Károly. Born 24 Nov 1803 in Russland zu Retsniow."  It was therefore refuted that he was born in Pest.

Life

Early life
There is little known about his childhood. Although it is known that he spent his summers at the family estate, Vécsey Castle at Solt, with his uncle, József Vécsey, in Gömör County. He spoke little Hungarian at first since both his parents had other primary languages. Vécsey therefore likely did not fully identify as Hungarian at this time. However this probably did not last long, growing up in a Hungarian dynasty. He followed the family tradition of choosing a military career and soon enrolled at the Empire's most prestigious military academy.

Military career
In 1820 he enlisted as a cadet in the 4th Imperial Dragoons.  In 1821 he was promoted to lieutenant and was transferred to the 5th Hussars.  By 1845 he was a major in the 5th Hussars.  He served as the commander of the King of Hanover's Imperial Hussar Regiment in the mid 1840s under Colonel Ernő Kiss, both of whom were also future martyred along with Vécsey. The regiment became one of the most distinguished in the Imperial Army and had the largest number of officers later join the rebellion. In the spring of 1848 the regiment was stationed in Nagybecskerek (today: Zrenjanin, Serbia).

Hungarian Revolution

Campaign against the Serbs
At the onset of the Hungarian Revolution of 1848, there was a large campaign to the south against the Serbians. The Austrians had promised the Serbians, along with other ethnic groups, various rewards if they fought against the Hungarian revolution. Vécsey did not particularly distinguish himself in this campaign, but, as Sebő Vukovics recalled, was "without notable actions, but sufficiently fulfilled his duty". As a result of his success he was promoted to colonel on October 12, 1848. Ernő Kiss then took command of his former regiment and he took command of an army brigade. On December 15 he became a division commander and was promoted to major general on December 12. The 2nd Hussars were then commanded by Major Gusztáv Pikéthy as temporary regimental commander.

At the beginning of January 1849, the government decided to withdraw forces from Bačka (Bácska) and Banat to concentrate strength closer to Debrecen, the provisional Hungarian capital at Tisza. There was a morale crisis as the soldiers were unsure of their ability to face imperial soldiers rather than Serb rebels.  The Verbász Bácska Corps officers held a meeting led by Count Sándor Esterházy stated that the Emperor would not likely break his oath and have Imperial soldiers fight against each other.

The situation threatened to break up the corps through a coup until Vécsey, Colonel János Lenkey and József Baudisz took action. As a result of Esterházy Maj and about forty officers left, but the majority of the troops remained in the Hungarian army convoy. The military crisis was only overcome by the fact that the revolution depended on the solidarity of the army. Lajos Kossuth wrote cordial letters Vécsey to thank the courageous action of the officers to the official government gazette.

Second battle of Szolnok

After the departure of Esterhazy on January 17 he took over the command of the corps for the Backa evacuation and joined up with the main army. Elements of the army's strength had been left at Szeged, thus the half-strength battalion arrived on February 12  at Torokszentmiklos, where it was stationed for the next two weeks. The standing army under the command of John Damjanich also sent substantial reinforcements to Major General Bem in the Transylvania theatre. Henryk Dembiński, the newly appointed commander-in-chief of all forces, organized a counter-attack using the two main divisions, aimed at the Szolnok bridgehead while diverting Windisch-Gratz's attention elsewhere. Dembiński planned to destroy any strategic holdings including a chapel, but the orders did not follow through, leading to the battled for the bridgehead on March 2.

Vécsey's division attacked Szolnok, diverting Leopold Karger Maj's brigade while Damjanich's Division crossed the Tisza, onto the Imperial side. However, due to a delay in the attack the encirclement failed completely.  The commanders reconvened and planned for another assault to take the bridgehead. The second battle for the bridge occurred on the 5th and resulted in a decisive Hungarian victory. For his role in the Szolnok victory he received the Hungarian Order of Military Merit III class.

After this battle Vecsey was made a general, causing General Damjanich to complain.  The complaint turned into a serious quarrel between the two generals and they refused to cooperate.  The dispute almost resulted in sedition and reflected the shortcomings of Hungarian higher command.  While Vecsey was popular among the soldiers, Damjanich had had no rivals before Vecsey's promotion. Lajos Kossuth Tiszafüred reported to the Chamber of Deputies on March 9 of the outcome: " General Vécsey nobly resigned his authority … and given total command to Damjanich. " Vécsey handed his two divisions over and formed a corps under the command of Damjanich in which Vecsey would serve as his second in command.

Siege of Arad

On April 7, 1849 he  was appointed to command the Sun Corps at the Siege of Arad castle. Initially the new position was not a fitting one, as he had little technical knowledge for siege tactics as a cavalry commander. However he eventually was able to implement his exceptional organizational skills better than his predecessors and improve the situation.  The defenses were reorganized and the siege guns were well kept, with an influx of supplies from Temesvár.  He also managed to slow the efforts of Major General Johann Berger to blockade the Maros river canal into the fort.  However, by March 25, Berger had blocked it off, negating any further supplies reaching the fort.  The castle's fate was ultimately decided by this, as it was only a matter of time before the defenses would fall. With supplies being exhausted by mid-July negotiations for a surrender began.

However, despite this setback, eventually the siege was relieved and the Imperial troops were defeated.  The Imperial troops retreated, bypassing Vecsey's command, who sent Lieutenant Colonel Francis with a brigade to block the retreat. Commander Bem, however, cancelled this order and called the brigade back, arguing that he had authority over the unit.  A disagreement followed and Vecsey claimed on April 23 that his authority and command as a general had been unjustly violated. Lugosról wrote a letter to the Government explaining the situation. In a strongly worded letter, Sandor Petofi Bem expressed his beliefs that was published in a newspaper in Cluj.  Although the government resolved the case, Vecsey demanded the military courts examine Bem's statements for accuracy. The situation was rescued by Kossuth, who organized a compromise in which both commanders maintained their respective commands and Vecsey was awarded a second Hungarian Order of Military Merit award.

The Hungarian leadership was critical of Vecsey in their opinion, believing him to be temperamental and misusing of his military talent.  Nicholas Perczel Kossuth wrote in a letter that during the siege of Arad, Vécsey was " very much shooting out uselessly". However, his subordinates, both officers and soldiers, spoke very highly of him; both of his strategic knowledge and of his treatment of the men.  He was particularly popular among the enlisted men, as he did his best to make sure they were equally equipped and provided for as the top officers.  He also took great measures to allow for the religious practices of his men.  Despite this popularity, on June 24 the Council of Ministers decided that Richard Guyon would take over command of the corps, although the officers stood beside Vecsey to prevent his replacement.

Siege and Battle of Temesvár

After General Bem's successful campaign in Transylvania, Banat was responsible for the occupation and reconstruction of the region. The campaign began in April, the first objective being the occupation of Temesvár, but it became apparent that the 9000 soldiers and 213 guns would not be enough, and so the attack was halted and resulted in a prolonged siege. Bem handed over command to Banat who then reorganized the troops.  On May 12, Vecsey's troops reengaged in the theater and defeated an Imperial force near Freidorf castle.  Around this point, Vecsey and his some 4400 men lacked any ability to move further due to lack of munitions and positioning.

Vecsey performed well given the circumstances, but was now once again in a dire situation while under siege, with supply cut off from fresh Imperial reinforcements.  The defenders could not break the blockade or drive off any detachments, and when the water supply was cut off, capitulation again became a serious option to be considered.  Henryk Dembiński, the Hungarian Supreme Commander, pressed through Temesvár aiming to relieve Arad by force, but was pushed back by Imperial and Russian troops.  The force retired to link up with the majority of the forces at Arad where the guns had already withdrawn to.

On August 9, 1849 the Battle of Temesvár occurred when Bem led some 4000 troops against the Imperial corps of Richard Guyon IV.  Vecsey sallied forth from Arad during the engagement and joined the battle.  Compared to other Hungarian units, Vecsey's unit had few casualties.  Ultimately, although both sides had taken heavy losses, the effect on the smaller Hungarian force was larger and thus they were forced to withdraw from the field.

Surrender at Nagyvárad
After the Battle of Temesvár, the retreating Hungarian army was split into two elements, one under Vécsey headed towards Lugos with the other element headed towards Karánsebes. Bem planned on heading to the Transylvanian mountain ranges to continue the fight and reunite the remaining Hungarian forces.  After linking up with Görgey's unit, Vecsey again took a detachment of some 8000 men to cross the Maros River.  Once again, the Hungarian army was split in two. General Bem parted with Vecsey with the farewell words of "All right, you go general; I must say the Austrians will hang you anyway!"

After Vecsey 's army crossed the Maros River near Tótvárad, he attacked an Imperial Brigade, where his army suffered heavy losses at the hands of Austrian cavalry.  The Hungarian army had already been battered and depleted of supply and could not perform well against the fresh Imperial and Russian troops. The only aim for the army and Vécsey was to surrender to the Russians first and hope to attain more favorable terms than surrendering to the Austrians.  On August 19, the Hungarian commanders sent messages to the Russians with details of negotiating the surrender. Vecsey then marched straight to Nagyvárad where he surrendered and had his soldiers lay down their weapons.

Lieutenant General Nikolai Leontyin Pavlovich, the Russian adjutant, noted "a small Hungarian cavalry regiment arrived in Nagyvárad [and] laid down their weapons in our presence. The scene was sad… when they learned that Görgey’s army had fled to the mountains to ... avoid an encounter with the Austrians. This resulted in the Nagyvárad surrender".

The Sun Corps infantry laid down their arms before the Russians on August 21 at Nagyvárad. Vecsey was placed into custody and a few days later brought to Arad and placed into Austrian custody.

Trial and execution

During the successful period of the Hungarian revolution, the Austrians sought the help of the Russian army.  This was seen as a major blow to Imperial prestige worldwide and when it became apparent the revolution would fail, the Hungarians believed they had beaten the Austrians and only lost to the outnumbering Russian army.

However, once the war was over, the humiliated Austrians had their opportunity to take revenge on the defeated Hungarians. A crackdown with harsh terms and conditions soon followed on the Hungarian troops.  Nicholas I of Russia advised Franz Joseph to be lenient on the vanquished Hungarians for political reasons and to ease reconciliation.  However, the decision for harsh punishment prevailed in a desire to discourage any more resistance.

Vecsey's trial began September 3, 1849 in a military court at Arad.  He was accused, along with many others, of being a ringleader of an insurgency. In his defense, Vecsey stated that "the Hungarian army was no insurgent army" stating that it was the army of a legitimate government and therefore the captured soldiers were entitled to proper military treatment.  He further supported this claim by stating that the Emperor had approved the Hungarian Constitution, and had therefore endorsed the nation.

Vecsey had no supporters, whereas some officers had Imperial connections that were able to spare their lives. Count Grünne, an influential member of the privy council did everything in his power to make sure Vecsey and the other martyrs received punishment to the greatest extent, as his father had demanded that the rebels be treated as criminals.  Vecsey was court-martialed and sentenced to death by hanging on September 21, 1849.

Vecsey read often while in prison. He had no family besides his wife, whom he wrote a farewell letter for the night before his death.  The sentence was carried out October 6, 1849.  The execution of the martyrs became a national heroic tale of Hungary, creating many legends.  It is difficult to discern truth and myth from the stories of the martyrs.  It is said that when Vecsey was stepping up to the gallows, he stopped to kiss the hand of his personal enemy John Damjanich. The story was accounted in an eyewitness testimony of the monk Eustic Sulyánszky, confessor of the Martyrs of Arad.

A witness at Arad recalled: "Vecsey was the last one. He said nothing, he just silently watched all of his comrades die first. At the moment when Vécsey was about to hang, there was a great noise from the people.  Vecsey’s straightened up and he stared with great interest at the crowd, as if expecting a miracle would arise...But then he too was dead."

Legacy

As in accordance with the Imperial court, Vecsey's body, along with the others, was buried in an unmarked grave at Arad.  Despite this, Franz Bott succeeded in bribing the executioner to allow most of the bodies to be moved.  Vecsey's remains were moved by a widow of an Arad lawyer, Catherine  Urbányi Andrásné Hegyessy, who delivered it to his wife Carolina. It was moved to the Arad public cemetery at night where it was hidden in the Rosa family crypt.  A year later it was transferred to a separate vault where it rested until 1916, when it was taken to the Arad Cultural Museum crypt.  Then in 1974 it was moved for the last time to a tomb monument at the place of execution in commemoration.

References

1803 births
1849 deaths
Karoly
The 13 Martyrs of Arad
People from Lipsko County
Executed Polish people
Executed Hungarian people
Executed people from Masovian Voivodeship